The Sahara Invitational was a PGA Tour event in Nevada from 1958 through 1976, played Las Vegas and sponsored by the Sahara Hotel. In the first four years, it was the Sahara Pro-Am and an unofficial tour event. Paradise Valley Country Club hosted in 1970 and 1971, and Sahara Nevada Country Club from 1972–1976.

Jack Nicklaus won Sahara four times in a seven-year span in the 1960s, and three future major champions (Tony Lema, Lanny Wadkins, and John Mahaffey) made Sahara their first tour victory.

A month after the 1976 event, it was announced in early November that the Sahara Invitational was being discontinued.  Edward M. Nigro, vice president and general manager of Hotel Sahara, cited rising costs, scheduling conflicts, and a decline in the national promotion benefit as the reasons for the tournament's cancellation.

The Las Vegas Founders returned the PGA Tour to Las Vegas in 1983 with the Panasonic Las Vegas Pro Celebrity Classic; since 2007, it has been organized by the Shriners Hospitals for Children.

Tournament highlights
1962: Tony Lema wins the inaugural Sahara Invitational, three shots ahead of Don January.
1964: R. H. Sikes shoots a first round 62 on his way to a two shot triumph over defending champion Jack Nicklaus, Phil Rodgers, and Jack McGowan.
1967: Jack Nicklaus becomes the only Sahara champion to successfully defend his title. He wins by one shot over Steve Spray.
1968: Chi-Chi Rodríguez shoots a final round 64 to come from six shots back and force a sudden death playoff. He then birdies the first playoff hole to defeat Dale Douglass.
1969: Nicklaus shoots a final round 65 for his 29th PGA Tour title and fourth Sahara victory. He finishes four shots ahead of Frank Beard.
1971: Lee Trevino wins his sixth PGA Tour event of the year, one shot ahead of George Archer.
1974: Al Geiberger wins for the first time on tour since his PGA Championship triumph in 1966;  he finishes three shots ahead of Jerry Heard, Wally Armstrong, Mike Hill, and Dave Hill.
1976: Runner-up five years earlier, Archer wins the last Sahara, two strokes ahead of defending champion Dave Hill and third round leader Don January.

Winners

Notes

References

External links
1970-1976 Results and stats on The Sahara Invitational

Former PGA Tour events
Recurring sporting events established in 1958
Recurring sporting events disestablished in 1976
Golf in Las Vegas
Pro–am golf tournaments
1958 establishments in Nevada
1976 disestablishments in Nevada